Klon may refer to:
Klon, Greater Poland Voivodeship, a village in Gmina Czajków, Ostrzeszów County, Greater Poland Voivodeship, Poland
Klon, Szczytno County, a village in Gmina Rozogi, Szczytno County, Warmian-Masurian Voivodeship, Poland
Klon (poetry), a form of Lao and Thai poetry
Kelon language, a Papuan language spoken on Alor Island, East Nusa Tenggara, Indonesia
Klon Centaur, a guitar overdrive pedal